Tulosesus hiascens is a species of mushroom producing fungus in the family Psathyrellaceae.

Taxonomy 
It was first described as Agaricus hiascens by the Swedish mycologist Elias Magnus Fries in 1821.

In 2001 a phylogenetic study resulted in a major reorganization and reshuffling of that genus and this species was transferred to Coprinellus.

The species was known as Coprinellus hiascens until 2020 when the German mycologists Dieter Wächter & Andreas Melzer reclassified many species in the Psathyrellaceae family based on phylogenetic analysis.

References

hiascens
Fungi described in 1821
Taxa named by Elias Magnus Fries
Tulosesus